Mildrey Carolina Pineda Echeverri (born 1 October 1989) is a Colombian international football player who plays for local club América Femenino as a midfielder.

References

External links 
 

1989 births
Living people
Women's association football midfielders
Colombian women's footballers
Colombia women's international footballers
2015 FIFA Women's World Cup players
Olympic footballers of Colombia
Footballers at the 2016 Summer Olympics
Pan American Games competitors for Colombia
Footballers at the 2015 Pan American Games
Pan American Games silver medalists for Colombia
Medalists at the 2015 Pan American Games
Pan American Games medalists in football
20th-century Colombian women
21st-century Colombian women